The 2019 J&T Banka Prague Open was a professional tennis tournament played on outdoor clay courts. It was the 10th edition of the tournament, and part of the International category of the 2019 WTA Tour. It took place at the Sparta Prague Tennis Club in Prague, Czech Republic, from 29 April to 4 May 2019.

Points and prize money

Prize money

Singles main draw entrants

Seeds

 Rankings are as of April 22, 2019.

Other entrants
The following players received wildcards into the singles main draw:
  Jana Čepelová
  Svetlana Kuznetsova
  Karolína Muchová

The following players received entry from the qualifying draw:
  Barbara Haas
  Antonia Lottner
  Iga Świątek
  Jil Teichmann

The following players received entry as lucky losers:
  Marie Bouzková
  Tamara Korpatsch
  Jasmine Paolini

Withdrawals
Before the tournament
  Belinda Bencic → replaced by  Stefanie Vögele
  Camila Giorgi → replaced by  Marie Bouzková
  Vera Lapko → replaced by  Mandy Minella
  Karolína Plíšková → replaced by  Jasmine Paolini
  Evgeniya Rodina → replaced by  Jessica Pegula
  Markéta Vondroušová → replaced by  Tamara Korpatsch

Doubles main draw entrants

Seeds 

 1 Rankings as of April 22, 2019.

Other entrants 
The following pairs received wildcards into the doubles main draw:
  Denisa Allertová /  Tereza Smitková 
  Marie Bouzková /  Eva Wacanno
The following pair received entry as alternates:
  Alena Fomina /  Ekaterine Gorgodze

Withdrawals
Before the tournament
  Jil Teichmann (leg injury)
  Markéta Vondroušová (viral illness)

Finals

Singles

  Jil Teichmann defeated  Karolína Muchová 7–6(7–5), 3–6, 6–4

Doubles

  Anna Kalinskaya /  Viktória Kužmová defeated  Nicole Melichar /  Květa Peschke, 4–6, 7–5, [10–7]

References

External links 
 Official website 

 
JandT Banka Prague Open
JandT Banka
2019
JandT Banka Prague Open
JandT Banka Prague Open